The 2013–14 Sussex County Football League season was the 89th in the history of Sussex County Football League, a football competition in England playing at Levels 9-11 in the English football league pyramid.

Division One

Division One featured 18 clubs which competed in the division last season, along with two new clubs, promoted from Division Two:
Littlehampton Town
Newhaven

East Preston have won the league but cannot be promoted after failing to meet the ground grading for Step 4.

League table

Results

Division Two

Division Two featured 15 clubs which competed in the division last season, along with two new clubs:
AFC Uckfield, demoted from Division One
Haywards Heath Town, promoted from Division Three

Also, Wick merged with Division Three club Barnham to create Wick & Barnham United.

League table

Results

Division Three

Division Three featured nine clubs which competed in the division last season, along with two new clubs:
Langney Wanderers, promoted from the East Sussex League
Southwick, demoted from Division Two

League table

References
 Sussex County Football League AGM 2013

External links
 Sussex County Football League

2013-14
9